Deep Fantasy is the third studio album by Canadian punk rock band White Lung. It was released on June 17, 2014. The album was produced by Jesse Gander, who also produced the band's previous album, Sorry.

Critical reception

According to review aggregator Metacritic, Deep Fantasy has a weighted average of 78 out of 100 based on 23 reviews, indicating "generally favorable reviews".

In 2016, Rolling Stone listed the album at number 38 on "The 40 Greatest Punk Albums of All-Time", describing it as "Like Black Flag fronted by the bastard daughter of Patti Smith and Stevie Nicks, with each song a nail bomb of desire."

Track listing
Drown with the Monster
Down It Goes
Snake Jaw
Face Down
I Believe You
Wrong Star
Just for You
Sycophant
Lucky One
In Your Home

References

2014 albums
Domino Recording Company albums
White Lung albums